Åneland is a small village in Evje og Hornnes municipality in Agder county, Norway.

References

Villages in Agder
Evje og Hornnes